Coosella helena is an extinct marine species of trilobite from the middle to upper Cambrian period. Fossils of this species can be found in North America, specifically, Canada. This specific species of trilobite was discovered by Christina Lochman-Balk on the St. George Peninsula of Newfoundland in 1938.

The Peabody Museum of Natural History holds both the holotype as well as 16 paratype specimens.

Fossil samples can be found in the fossil collection of Mount Holyoke College in South Hadley, Massachusetts, where Lochman-Balk used to teach as an associate professor (1935-1947).

See also 
 Christina Lochman-Balk

References 

Ptychopariida
Cambrian trilobites
Cambrian trilobites of North America
Extinct animals of North America